Taylor McFerrin (born June 28, 1981 at San Francisco, California) is an American DJ, music producer, keyboardist & beatboxer based in Brooklyn, New York City, United States. He is the eldest son of popular vocalist and classical conductor Bobby McFerrin.

McFerrin released his debut album Early Riser (2014) on Flying Lotus' Brainfeeder Records. The album features guest appearances from Nai Palm (Hiatus Kaiyote), Thundercat, Robert Glasper, Cesar Mariano, Marcus Gilmore and Bobby McFerrin.

Taylor's latest musical venture sees him as part of Robert Glasper's new jazz fusion supergroup, "R+R=Now", alongside Christian Scott, Terrace Martin, Derrick Hodge and Justin Tyson. The group released an album, Collagically Speaking via Blue Note Records in June 2018.

Discography

Albums
2014: Early Riser
2019: Love's Last Chance

EPs
2006: Broken Vibes

Singles
2011: "Place in My Heart"

Other appearances

References

External links
Official website

African-American record producers
Record producers from New York (state)
African-American male singer-songwriters
American multi-instrumentalists
American beatboxers
American DJs
Musicians from Brooklyn
Living people
Singer-songwriters from New York (state)
21st-century African-American male singers
1981 births